Hazera-Taju University College is a non-government honors level degree college situated at Chandgaon Thana, Chittagong, Bangladesh. The institution was founded by former member of parliament for Chittagong-8 Nurul Islam (BSc) in 1991 as a women's college. From the very beginning of its establishment to 2005 the institution would only offer Degree pass certificate course in science, arts and commerce. But from 2006 the institution offers graduation in management and from 2007 it offers graduation in accounting. The institution is trying its best to offer graduation in many other subjects at near future. However, at present, the institution has become a full-fledged university college.

History
It was established in 1991 as a women's college.

Students
There are 5000 students study in this college.

Management
It has a governing body who conduct this college.

Faculties and departments
The institution has following faculty and departments:

Department 
 Science 
 Commerce 
 Arts

Faculty of BBA 
 Department of Management
 Department of Accounting

Faculty of Social Science 
Department of Economics

Academic recognition

Association
 Hazera Taju University College Alumni Association (Association of ex-Students)

See also
 University of Chittagong

References

External links 
 Official Website  

Private universities in Bangladesh
Colleges in Chittagong